Lac de Tavaneuse is a lake at Abondance in Haute-Savoie, France.

Tavaneuse